Lucas Purugganan Bersamin (born October 18, 1949) is a Filipino lawyer and jurist who currently serves as the 40th Executive Secretary of the Philippines. Bersamin previously served in the Supreme Court of the Philippines for 10 years, first as an associate justice from 2009 to 2018 and then as the 25th Chief Justice of the Philippines from 2018 until his retirement in 2019. He was named by President Gloria Macapagal Arroyo to the high court as an associate justice on April 2, 2009. Prior to becoming an associate justice, he was a member of the Court of Appeals.

He was the chairperson of the Government Service Insurance System and a member of its board of trustees since 2020 until his appointment as Executive Secretary in the Marcos Jr. administration, as confirmed by Press Secretary Trixie Cruz-Angeles on September 27, 2022.

Biography
Bersamin earned his undergraduate degree from the University of the Philippines and graduated from the University of the East College of Law in 1973. He placed 9th in the 1973 Bar Examinations, with an average of 86.3%. He was then named a fellow at the Commonwealth Judicial Education Institute in Dalhousie University in Halifax, Nova Scotia, Canada.

Educational career
He was in private practice from 1974 until 1986, when he was appointed a trial court judge in Quezon City by President Corazon Aquino. Bersamin was a professor at the Ateneo Law School, the University of the East College of Law, and the University of Santo Tomas Faculty of Civil Law. He was special lecturer at the College of Law, University of Cebu in 2006. He continues to lecture for the Philippine Judicial Academy.

Law career
In 2003, Bersamin was elevated to the Court of Appeals by President Gloria Macapagal-Arroyo. In April 2009, Bersamin was elevated by President Arroyo to associate justice of the Supreme Court of the Philippines.

Bersamin was one of the associate justices who voted in favor of the quo warranto petition against Maria Lourdes Sereno, which led to the appointment of Teresita de Castro as new chief justice of the Philippines, replacing Maria Lourdes Sereno. President Rodrigo Duterte appointed Bersamin as the new chief justice on November 26, 2018, succeeding Teresita Leonardo-De Castro.

On February 6, 2020, Bersamin was appointed by Duterte to be the chairperson of the Government Service Insurance System (GSIS) and a member of the agency's board of trustees. He will serve the unexpired term of former GSIS president Jesus Clint Aranas, which ended on June 30, 2020.

He is the brother of congressman Luis "Chito" P. Bersamin, Jr. of Abra, who was gunned down during a wedding ceremony and of Abra governor Eustaquio P. Bersamin.

Personal life
Bersamin is married to the former Aurora A. Bagares, a business proprietress, with whom he has three children: Pia Cristina, Luis Isidro, and Lucas Riel, Jr.

References

|-

|-

|-

1949 births
Living people
Associate Justices of the Supreme Court of the Philippines
Chief justices of the Supreme Court of the Philippines
20th-century Filipino judges
People from Abra (province)
University of the Philippines alumni
21st-century Filipino judges
Bongbong Marcos administration cabinet members